Lisa Katharina Hill (born 16 July 1992 in Kiel) is a German artistic gymnast. She was the alternate for the German team that finished ninth at the 2012 Summer Olympics. She was a member of the German team that finished eleventh at the 2010 World Championships, and she helped the team finish sixth at the 2011 World Championships. At the 2013 Summer Universiade, she won a bronze medal with her team and on the uneven bars. At the 2014 World Championships, she helped the German team finish ninth. She was the only member of the German team to qualify for the all-around final, where she finished 22nd. She finished seventh in the uneven bars final with a score of 14.333.

References

German female artistic gymnasts
Universiade medalists in gymnastics
Living people
1992 births
Universiade bronze medalists for Germany
Medalists at the 2013 Summer Universiade
Sportspeople from Kiel